Stanford Research Park (SRP) is a technology park established in 1951 as a joint initiative between Stanford University and the City of Palo Alto. It was the world's first university research park.  It has more than 150 companies, including Hewlett-Packard, Tesla Motors, TIBCO and VMware; previously, it housed high-profile companies, including Steve Jobs's NeXT Computer, Xerox PARC, and Facebook. It has been called "an engine for Silicon Valley" and "the epicenter of Silicon Valley".

Facilities
As of January 2018, the park's 140 buildings house over 150 different companies and their 23,000 employees. It is currently home to companies like Hewlett-Packard, Lockheed Martin, Tesla Motors, Nest, Skype, TIBCO and SAP. VMware is the park's largest tenant as of January 2018.

In 2016, SRP contributed an estimated $775 million in terms of economic activity to Palo Alto and approximately $2.4 billion to Santa Clara County. In 2016, SRP contributed more than $45 million in taxes (across local, state, and federal).

History

After World War II, Stanford University found itself in difficult financial circumstances. But given that it was rich in land, Stanford University Provost and Dean of Engineering Frederick Terman proposed a Stanford-affiliated and R&D-focused business park that would generate income for Stanford as well as tax revenue for the Palo Alto community. Stanford University and the City of Palo Alto partnered to found the park, which was initially named Stanford Industrial Park. In 1951, the initiative was authorized and 209 acres were allocated. In 1953 Varian Associates moved in as the park's first tenant.

In the early days, Stanford tightly controlled development, without the help of an outside developer. It also rigorously screened potential tenants to ensure they were in line with university objectives. By 1956 Hewlett-Packard established its world headquarters in SRP. The park acquired more land as it grew from 40 tenants in 1960 to 100 tenants in 1985 to over 150 as of January 2018.

The name was changed in the 1970s to Stanford Research Park from Stanford Industrial Park to highlight "the focus of cooperation between the university and the tech companies". In 1991, the Stanford Management Company was established to manage the university's financial and real estate assets, including SRP.

Controversies

In 2014 the Palo Alto City Council allowed a proposed 17-acre affordable housing community with 180 units in the Stanford Research Park to proceed, despite protests by neighborhood residents. Called Mayfield Place, the community opened in June 2017.

In 2016, Stanford University and 12 of the park's largest companies formed the Transportation Management Association in order to mitigate traffic congestion from employee commutes, noting that it was making companies within the park less attractive to current and prospective employees. SRP lacks a nearby Caltrain station. The group is exploring several options, including "new shuttles, carpool routes and a trip-planning app".

Tenants
The following tenants currently have offices at the Stanford Research Park.

 VMware
 Tesla
 Dupont
 Ford
 HP
 Cooley LLP
 Wilson Sonsini Goodrich & Rosati
 Stanford Genome Technology Center
 Jazz Pharmaceuticals
 Lockheed Martin
 PARC (a Xerox Company)
 MZ
 Electric Power Research Institute
 Foley & Lardner
 Rubrik
 SAP
 StartX
 TIBCO
 Varian
 Rivian

See also
 Business cluster
 Mega-Site

References

1951 establishments in California
Economy of the San Francisco Bay Area
Buildings and structures in Palo Alto, California
Research Park
Science parks in the United States